Udeocorini is a tribe of dirt-colored seed bugs in the family Rhyparochromidae. There are about 17 genera and more than 30 described species in Udeocorini.

Genera
These 17 genera belong to the tribe Udeocorini:

 Astemmoplitus Spinola, 1852
 Bathycles Distant, 1893
 Cryptocoris Gross, 1962
 Daerlac Signoret, 1881
 Euander Stal, 1865
 Fontejanus Breddin, 1904
 Fontejus Stal, 1862
 Insulicola Kirkaldy, 1908
 Laryngodus Herrich-Schaeffer, 1850
 Neosuris Barber, 1924
 Porander Gross, 1962
 Serranegra Lindberg, 1958
 Telocoris Gross, 1962
 Tempyra Stal, 1874
 Udeocoris Bergroth, 1918
 Udeopamera Slater, 1978
 Zygocoris Gross, 1962

References

Further reading

External links

 

Rhyparochromidae
Articles created by Qbugbot